Kroken is a neighborhood in the city of Tromsø which lies in Tromsø Municipality in Troms og Finnmark county, Norway. The neighborhood is located along the Tromsøysundet strait on the mainland, just across the strait from the city centre of Tromsø which lies on the island of Tromsøya. The village is considered part of the Tromsdalen urban area.

Kroken is a large residential area that has two schools, Kroken Church, the Ishavsbyen FK association football club, and the Krokensenteret shopping mall, where Norway's largest Coop Prix is located.

References

Villages in Troms
Tromsø